Restoule is a community and designated place in geographic Patterson Township in the Centre Unorganized Part of Parry Sound District in Central Ontario, Canada. It is situated on the Restoule River between Commanda Lake, and Restoule Lake and is part of the Almaguin Highlands region.

Restoule has a local services board that covers the main community of Restoule and the small communities of Carr and Farley's Corners in neighbouring geographic Pringle Township. Along with the nearby communities of Loring and Port Loring and other smaller hamlets, the area promotes itself as the Loring-Restoule tourist area.

Restoule is located south of Lake Nipissing, and north of Ontario's famous cottage country. Despite being north of this area, Restoule is a major centre for cottages, as is the entire Loring-Restoule region. Due to location and distance from Toronto, Restoule is not as popular as regions such as Muskoka to the south. The largest nearby city is North Bay 65 kilometres by road northeast of Restoule.

Restoule is located on Ontario Highway 534 and is a 9 kilometre drive southeast of Restoule Provincial Park. There is only one way to get into Restoule, and that's on Highway 534 from the east. There's a secondary route from the west from Dokis territory and leads into town on Hawthorne Rd. Entering the village, one can see the main General Store off the highway on the right. The main centre of the community however can be found off Highway 534, across the Restoule River. On this side of the river, there is a Royal Canadian Legion (Branch #639), a Lion's Club, Community Centre, Outdoor Hockey Rink, Play structures, and a United Church. There is a Pentecostal Corner Gospel Church 5 km east of the village at the intersection of Hwys. 524 and 534. There are several housekeeping cottages, camps and lodges.

Cottages dot the shores of both Restoule Lake north of town and Commanda Lake south of town. Also dotting the rolling countryside are various farms. Most of all, the scenery is dominated by majestic forests on the Canadian Shield.

Restoule residents elect three local government organizations to manage their affairs: The Restoule Local Services Board, Patterson Township Local Roads Board and Restoule Sanitary Landfill Committee.

Restoule has broadband Internet access and cell phone service provided by Bell. As of August 2020, there is Fido/Rogers coverage (albeit 'roaming') in the area, including at nearby Restoule Provincial Park.

Etymology
This place in Parry Sound District, 36.1 km west of Powassan, was named in 1878 after Ojibwa chief Joseph Restoule, who was still alive when the postmaster provided details to the chief geographer of Canada in 1905.

Other places of the same name in Ontario
There is also a geographic Restoule Township in Algoma District, Ontario, on the Algoma Central Railway.

Demographics 

According to the Canada 2016 Census:
 Population: 455
 % Change (2011-2016): +3.4
 Dwellings: 539
 Area (km²): 125.64
 Density (persons per km²): 3.6

Notable residents
 Frances Lankin, Canadian senator and former NDP Member of Provincial Parliament.

Politics

Politically, Restoule, as with most of rural Parry Sound District leans Conservative.

Election results in Restoule
Federal
|}

|Liberal
|Andy Mitchell
|align="right"|69
|align="right"|29.11
|align="right"|40.04

|New Democratic Party
|Jo-Anne Boulding
|align="right"|40
|align="right"|16.88
|align="right"|11.85

|}

|}

|Liberal
|Andy Mitchell
|align="right"|63
|align="right"|28.90
|align="right"|43.86

|New Democratic Party
|Jo-Anne Marie Boulding
|align="right"|22
|align="right"|10.09
|align="right"|11.77

|}

|}

|Liberal
|Andy Mitchell
|align="right"|59
|align="right"|27.06
|align="right"|47.51

|Progressive Conservative
|Keith Montgomery
|align="right"|29
|align="right"|13.30
|align="right"|18.71

|New Democratic Party
|Joanne Bury
|align="right"|10
|align="right"|4.59
|align="right"|4.41

|}

|}

|Progressive Conservative
|Lewis MacKenzie
|align="right"|81
|align="right"|33.75
|align="right"|26.79

|Liberal
|Andy Mitchell
|align="right"|62
|align="right"|25.83
|align="right"|41.59

|New Democratic Party
|Carl Wirth
|align="right"|22
|align="right"|9.17
|align="right"|3.98

|Jackie Raney
|align="right"|1
|align="right"|0.42
|align="right"|0.55

|Natural Law
|Rick Alexander
|align="right"|1
|align="right"|0.42
|align="right"|0.31
|}

Provincial
|}

|Progressive Conservative
|Norm Miller
|align="right"|118
|align="right"|55.40
|align="right"|48.51

|Liberal
|Dan Waters
|align="right"|55
|align="right"|25.82
|align="right"|34.44

|New Democratic Party
|Jo-Anne Boulding
|align="right"|23
|align="right"|10.80
|align="right"|9.92

|}
|}

|Progressive Conservative
|Norm Miller
|align="right"|58
|align="right"|49.15
|align="right"|49.30

|Liberal
|Evelyn Brown
|align="right"|31
|align="right"|26.27
|align="right"|34.31

|New Democratic Party
|Joanne Bury
|align="right"|3
|align="right"|2.54
|align="right"|3.39

|Independent
|Anne Marsden
|align="right"|2
|align="right"|1.69
|align="right"|0.43

|Independent
|John Turmel
|align="right"|1
|align="right"|0.85
|align="right"|0.23
|}
|}

|Progressive Conservative
|Ernie Eves
|align="right"|137
|align="right"|57.32
|align="right"|57.68

|Liberal
|Isabel Doxey
|align="right"|68
|align="right"|28.45
|align="right"|27.55

|New Democratic Party
|Dan Waters
|align="right"|31
|align="right"|12.97
|align="right"|13.42

|Natural Law
|Iris Tamssot
|align="right"|3
|align="right"|1.26
|align="right"|0.85
|}
|}

|Progressive Conservative
|Ernie Eves
|align="right"|181
|align="right"|67.54
|align="right"|65.47

|New Democratic Party
|Dan Reed
|align="right"|57
|align="right"|21.27
|align="right"|14.20

|Liberal
|Mark Fisher
|align="right"|30
|align="right"|11.19
|align="right"|20.33
|}

References

Other map sources:

External links

Communities in Parry Sound District
Designated places in Ontario
Local services boards in Ontario